Sheikh Mithal al-Hasnawi was a representative of radical cleric Moqtada al Sadr in Karbala, Iraq, before being captured by US and Iraqi National Guard troops in a joint operation on July 31, 2004. His brother was also captured in the raid.

See also
 Moqtada al-Sadr
 Mahdi Army

External links
 Al Jazeera--US troops detain al-Sadr Aide

People of the Iraq War
Islam in Iraq
Living people
Year of birth missing (living people)
Place of birth missing (living people)